The 1971 Road Atlanta Can-Am race was the third round of the 1971 Can-Am Challenge Cup.  It was held July 11, 1971, at Road Atlanta in Braselton, Georgia.  It was the second Can-Am race held at the track.

Results
 
Pole position: Denny Hulme, 1:17.700
Fastest lap: Jackie Stewart (lap 28), 1:17.42
Race distance: 
Winner's average speed:

External links
Race results from World Sports Racing Prototypes
Race results from Ultimate Racing History

Road Atlanta
Road Atlanta Can-Am
Road Atlanta